Gavro Bagić (born 2 May 1985) is a Croatian football striker playing for NK Metalac Osijek.

Club career
Born in Uglješ, SR Croatia, back in Yugoslavia, Gavro Bagić spent most of his career playing with NK Metalac Osijek.  He started playing in the academy of NK Osijek and when he finished his period as youth player he was to move to Belgrade to join Serbian side FK Voždovac but by the insistence of his father he stayed in Osijek and joined lower-level Metalac, where he will play for most of the following decade. He became a prolific goalscorer, and his skills didn't pass unnoticed even across the border in Serbia where, by that time a stable SuperLiga side FK Hajduk Kula, brought him to their team in summer 2010. As a young foreign newcomer, Bagić had it hard to break into the starting line-up, so he ended up leaving Hajduk Kula during the winter-break after having made only one appearance in the 2010–11 Serbian SuperLiga. He then had a short spell with NK Karlovac in Croatian Second League before returning to Metalac Osijek.  Then in July 2012, he signed with Croatian top-league side and the major club in Slavonia, NK Osijek. Bagić made six appearances with Osijek in the 2012–13 Croatian First League; however, his reputation of terrific goalscorer, that he brought from the main seasons with Metalac, was pale since he failed to score at all at Croatian highest level. At the end of the season, he returned to the club he became a symbol of, Metalac Osijek, and has revived immediately his goalscoring abilities; by the winter-break, Bagić was the leading goalscorer of the league with 17 goals in 15 games.

References

1985 births
Living people
People from Osijek-Baranja County
Association football forwards
Croatian footballers
NK Metalac Osijek players
FK Hajduk Kula players
NK Karlovac players
NK Osijek players
Serbian SuperLiga players
First Football League (Croatia) players
Croatian Football League players
Croatian expatriate footballers
Expatriate footballers in Serbia
Croatian expatriate sportspeople in Serbia